Paul Mantoux (14 April 1877 – 14 December 1956) was a historian. He wrote about the industrial revolution in Great Britain.
He was a Co-Founder of the Graduate Institute of International Studies (now IHEID) and interpreter for Georges Clemenceau at the Paris Peace Conference in 1919.

One of his children was the economist Étienne Mantoux.

Works
 La Révolution industrielle au XVIIIe siècle. Essai sur les commencements de la grande industrie moderne en Angleterre. Paris: Société de librairie et d'édition, Pp. 544
 English translation: The Industrial Revolution in the Eighteenth Century: An Outline of the Beginnings of the Modern Factory System in England tr. Marjorie Vernon. London: Jonathan Cape, 1929, 539 pp.

École Normale Supérieure alumni
1877 births
1956 deaths
French male non-fiction writers
Academic staff of the Graduate Institute of International and Development Studies